The Interpretaris is an Australian science fiction television series which first screened on the ABC in 1966. It was later also screened on the Seven Network. It was part of a trilogy with spin-offs  Vega 4 in 1968 and Phoenix Five in 1970. The show is named for a spaceship with a multinational crew tasked with finding the home systems of captured alien life forms.

Cast
 Stanley Walsh as Commander Alan De Breck
 Lorraine Bayly as Vera Balovna
 Kit Taylor as David Carmichael
 Ben Gabriel as Parta Beno
 Gordon Mutch as Henry, the computeroid 
 Judi Farr as Alys, the computer

References

External links
The Interpretaris at Australian Classic Television

Australian science fiction television series
Australian children's television series
1966 Australian television series debuts
English-language television shows